Carlile is a given name. It may refer to the following notable people:
Carlile Aylmer Macartney (1895–1978), British academic specialising in the history and politics
 Carlile Henry Hayes Macartney  (1842–1924), British painter and Orientalist
Carlile Pollock Patterson (1816–1881), superintendent of the United States Coast Survey
USC&GS Carlile P. Patterson

See also

Carlile (surname)
Carlisle (given name)
Carlyle (name)

English masculine given names